= Livhuwani Ethel Ligaraba =

South African politician

Livhuwani Ethel Ligaraba MP

Member of the National Assembly of South Africa
- Incumbent
- Assumed office 2024

Personal details
- Other political affiliations: African National Congress

Livhuwani Ethel Ligaraba is a South African politician who has been a Member of Parliament (MP) for the African National Congress.
